The 2019–20 FC Rostov season was the club's eleventh successive season in the Russian Premier League, the highest tier of football in Russia.

Season events
On 13 June, Rostov announced Adidas as their new technical partner.

On 17 March, the Russian Premier League postponed all league fixtures until April 10th due to the COVID-19 pandemic.

On 1 April, the Russian Football Union extended the suspension of football until 31 May.

On 15 May, the Russian Football Union announced that the Russian Premier League season would resume on 21 June.

On 17 June, Rostov announced that six players had tested positive for COVID-19, resulting 42 employees of the club going into a 2-week quarantine, with their youth team travelling to play Sochi on 19 June.

Transfers
On 7 June, Rostov announced the signing of Dmitri Chistyakov on a four-year contract from Tambov.

On 11 June, Rostov announced the signing of Aleksandr Saplinov on a four-year contract from Baltika Kaliningrad.

On 24 June, Sergei Parshivlyuk left Rostov and signed for Dynamo Moscow

On 28 June, Matija Boben made his loan move to Livorno permanent.

On 3 July, Aleksei Kozlov joined from Dynamo Moscow.

On 9 July, Konstantin Pliyev moved to Rubin Kazan on a season-long loan deal.

On 11 July, Rostov signed four-year contracts with Danila Proshlyakov, joining from Spartak Moscow, and Aleksandr Dolgov who joined from Lokomotiv Moscow.

On 12 July, Yegor Baburin signed on a four-year contract from Zenit St.Petersburg, and Vladimir Medved joined from FC Slutsk.

On 17 July, Rostov announced that Alexandru Gațcan would leave the club after their match against Spartak Moscow on 20 July, ending his 11-year stint at the club.

On 19 July, Reziuan Mirzov moved to Spartak Moscow.

On 20 July, Viðar Örn Kjartansson moved to Rubin Kazan on loan.

On 1 August, Artyom Shchadin left Rostov to sign for Torpedo-BelAZ Zhodino.

On 28 September, Pavel Mamayev signed on a two-year contract after he'd been released by Krasnodar on 20 September.

On 1 January, Ragnar Sigurðsson left Rostov by mutual consent.

On 9 January, Rostov announced the signing of Maksim Osipenko to a 4.5-year contract on a free transfer following his release from Tambov.

On 12 February, Rostov signed Maksim Rudakov from Zenit St.Petersburg on a 4.5-year contract.

On 14 February, Anton Salétros joined Sarpsborg 08 on loan until 31 July.

On 3 July, Rostov announced the signing of Russian U18 forward Danila Sukhomlinov.

On 7 July, Rostov announced the signing of David Toshevski from FK Rabotnički on a five-year contract.

On 9 July, Rostov announced the signing of Kento Hashimoto from FC Tokyo on a four-year contract.

On 13 July, Rostov announced the signing of Konstantin Kovalyov from Avangard Kursk.

New contracts
On 7 June, Sergei Pesyakov signed a new three-contract whilst Eldor Shomurodov signed a new five-year contract.

On 14 June 2019, Rostov announced that Roman Eremenko had extended his contract with the club for four-years.

On 17 June 2019, Rostov announced that Alexandru Gațcan had extended his contract with the club for another year.

Squad

On loan

Left club during season

Transfers

In

Out

Loans out

Released

Trial

Friendlies

Competitions

Premier League

Results by round

Results

League table

Russian Cup

Squad statistics

Appearances and goals

|-
|colspan="14"|Players away from the club on loan:

|-
|colspan="14"|Players who appeared for Rostov but left during the season:

|}

Goal scorers

Clean sheets

Disciplinary record

References

FC Rostov seasons
Rostov